František Masarovič was a former Slovak football player. In the 1930s, he played for FC Spartak Trnava and ŠK Slovan Bratislava.

References 

Living people
Slovak footballers
FC Spartak Trnava players
ŠK Slovan Bratislava players
Association footballers not categorized by position
Year of birth missing (living people)